The Jacques Herbrand Prize (French: Prix Jacques Herbrand) is an award given by the French Academy of Sciences to young researchers (up to 35 years) in the field of mathematics, physics, and their non-military applications.
It was created in 1996, and first awarded in 1998.
In 2001, it was renamed to Grand Prix Jacques Herbrand .
Until 2002, the prize was given each year in both fields; since 2003, it is given alternatingly.
It is endowed with 15000, later with 20000 euros, and named in honor of the French logician Jacques Herbrand (1908-1931).

Recipients
 1998: Loïc Merel, mathematics; Franck Ferrari, physics
 1999: , mathematics; Brahim Louis, physics
 2000: Albert Cohen (mathematician), mathematics; Philippe Bouyer, physics
 2001: Laurent Lafforgue, mathematics; Yvan Castin, physics
 2002: Christophe Breuil, mathematics; Pascal Salière, physics
 2003: Wendelin Werner, mathematics
 2004: Nikita Nekrasov, physics
 2005: Franck Barthe, mathematics
 2006: Maxime Dahan, physics
 2007: Cédric Villani, mathematics
 2008: Lucien Besombes, physics
 2009: Artur Ávila, mathematics
 2010: Julie Grollier, physics
 2011: Nalini Anantharaman, mathematics
 2012: Patrice Bertet, physics
 2013: , mathematics
 2014: Aleksandra Walczak, physics
 2015: , mathematics
 2016: Yasmine Amhis, physics 
 2017: Hugo Duminil-Copin, mathematics 
 2018 : Alexei Chepelianskii, 
 2019 : Nicolas Curien 
 2020 : Basile Gallet

See also
 Herbrand Award — by the Conference on Automated Deduction, for contributions in the field of automated deduction
 List of mathematics awards
 List of physics awards

References

Awards of the French Academy of Sciences
Mathematics awards
Physics awards